John Brandenberg is a former member of the Ohio General Assembly.  Brandenberg was originally elected in 1972, and reelected in 1974.  However, in 1976, former Rep. Thomas Pottenger opted to run for Bradenberg's seat, creating a primary for the Republican nomination.  As a result, Brandenberg was defeated for a third term, and Pottenger went on to win the general election. Prior and after his stint in the House, Brandenberg practiced private law.

References

Republican Party members of the Ohio House of Representatives
Living people
Year of birth missing (living people)